The Rhodes Cabin was built in 1928 to accommodate tourists visiting what was then Lehman Caves National Monument, now Great Basin National Park. The cabin was one of several built by local contractor Charles Davis near the entrance to Lehman Caves for concessioners Clarence and Bea Rhodes.  Rhodes built a number of structures in the area, including the "Pine Bowery" and the "Lehman Tea Room", as well as developing access within Lehman Cave.

The one room log cabin measures , with two doors, four windows and a dirt floor. The cabin is now part of an interpretative exhibit.

The state of Nevada paid Rhodes $15,000 for his facilities in 1932 and donated the property to the Park Service in 1933. During the 1930s the cabin was converted for housing for National Park Service employees. It is one of the last surviving structures of its era in the park.

References

External links

Log cabins in the United States
Houses in White Pine County, Nevada
Houses completed in 1928
Houses on the National Register of Historic Places in Nevada
Nevada State Register of Historic Places
1928 establishments in Nevada
Historic American Buildings Survey in Nevada
National Register of Historic Places in Great Basin National Park
Log buildings and structures on the National Register of Historic Places in Nevada